The New Guinea waterside rat (Parahydromys asper) is the only member of the genus Parahydromys.  It is considered part of the New Guinea Old Endemics, meaning its ancestors were part of the first wave of murine rodents to colonize the island. It is commonly called the "Guinea rat".

Names
It is known as godmg or nyabap in the Kalam language of Papua New Guinea.

References

Old World rats and mice
Rodents of Papua New Guinea
Mammals of Western New Guinea
Mammals described in 1906
Taxa named by Oldfield Thomas
Rodents of New Guinea

de:Bergschwimmratte
eu:Parahydromys asper
fr:Parahydromys asper
it:Parahydromys asper
lt:Kalninės vandeninės žiurkės
nl:Parahydromys
sr:Parahydromys asper
zh:粗毛水鼠屬